Alexander Rijn "Alex" Wynaendts (born 1 August 1960) is a Dutch businessman who served as CEO and chairman of the board of Aegon N.V. from 2008 until 2020.

Early life
Wynaendts was born in August 1, 1960 in Almelo. His father :nl:Henry Wijnaendts is a longtime Dutch diplomat who served as Ambassador to France from 1989 to 1997.

Wynaendts attended French schools in Beirut, Jakarta and Brussels. He graduated from École Supérieure d’Electricité in Paris in 1984 and also obtained a degree in economics at the University of La Sorbonne Paris in 1984.

Career
Wynaendts began his career with ABN AMRO in 1984, working in the bank’s private banking and investment banking operations in both Amsterdam and London.

Prior to being appointed as CEO of Aegon, Wynaendts held a number of different positions within the company, beginning in 1997 in Group Business Development. In particular, he established and expanded Aegon’s presence in new markets in Asia such as China, Hong Kong, India and Japan, as well as the fast-developing region of Central and Eastern Europe. Wynaendts joined Aegon’s Executive Board in 2003 and was appointed Chief Operating Officer in 2007.

Following his appointment as CEO in May 2008, Wynaendts led Aegon through the financial crisis that started in the summer of 2008. He also led a series of disposals in an effort to streamline the business, including the 2011 sale of Transamerica Corporation to French reinsurer SCOR for $900 million.

In May 2020, Wynaendts retired after 12 years as CEO of Aegon.

Other activities

Corporate boards
 Citigroup, Member of the Board of Directors (since 2019)
 Air France–KLM, Member of the Board of Directors (since 2016)
 Uber Technologies, Member of the Board of Directors (since 2021)
 Salesforce, Member of the Advisory Board on Europe, the Middle East and Africa (since 2020)

Non-profit organizations
 Rijksmuseum, Chairman of the Supervisory Board (since 2018)
 De Hoge Veluwe National Park, Member of the Supervisory Board (since 2020)
 European Financial Round Table (EFR), Member (2008-2020)

Personal life
Wynaendts lives in The Hague, The Netherlands. He is married to Caroline André de la Porte, an artist, and has two children.

References

1960 births
Living people
Dutch chief executives in the finance industry
University of Paris alumni
Place of birth missing (living people)